The following is an incomplete list of backmasked messages in music.

See also
 Backmasking
 Phonetic reversal
 Hidden message
 Subliminal message

References

External links
 Backmask Online — clips and analysis of various alleged and actual backmasked messages
 Jeff Milner's Backmasking Page — a Flash player which allows backwards playback of various alleged and actual messages with and without lyrics; the focus of the Wall Street Journal article

Audio engineering
Urban legends
Music-related lists
Perception
Popular music